Feather mites are the members of diverse mite superfamilies:

 superorder Acariformes
 Psoroptidia
 Analgoidea
 Freyanoidea
 Pterolichoidea
 superorder Parasitiformes
 Dermanyssoidea

They are ectoparasites on birds, hence the common name.

References 

Ectoparasites
Parasitic acari
Parasites of birds
Arthropod common names